John Burgh may refer to:

John Burgh I (fl. 1399), MP for Bodmin in 1399
John Burgh II (died 1434), MP for Surrey 1413–1416
John Burgh III (died 1436), MP for Rutland 1413–1415 and Leicestershire 1421 and 1433
 John Burgh (MP for Brackley), see Brackley (UK Parliament constituency)
John Burgh (MP for Wallingford), see Wallingford (UK Parliament constituency)
Sir John Burgh (officer) (1562–1594), English military and naval commander
Sir John Burgh (died 2013), senior British civil servant and President of Trinity College, Oxford

See also
John de Burgh (disambiguation)
John Borough, Garter Principal King of Arms 1633-43